Pehchan is a 1970 Filmfare Award winning Bollywood romance film produced & directed by Sohanlal Kanwar, & the story is by Sachin Bhowmick. The film stars Manoj Kumar, Babita, and Balraj Sahni.  Music is by Shankar Jaikishan.

Cast
Manoj Kumar ...  Gangaram 'Ganga' Ramkishan 
Babita Kapoor ...  Barkha
Balraj Sahni ...  Ex-Firefighter
Sailesh Kumar ...  Rajiv 'Raju'
Chand Usmani ...  Champa
Tun Tun...  Ganga's prospective bride
Brahm Bhardwaj ...  Maya's dad
Lata Bose ...  Maya
C. S. Dubey ...  Sunder
Daisy Irani ...  Rani
Kuljeet ...  Rakesh
Sulochana Latkar ...  Barkha's mom
Rajrani ...  Maya's mom
Keshav Rana ...  Rakesh's employee
Lyricist Prof. Gopaldas Neeraj..."Paise Ki Pehchan Yahan" Picturised On Neeraj.

Music 
The music for the film is composed by Shankar Jaikishan on lyrics of Verma Malik, Hasrat Jaipuri, Indeevar and Neeraj.

Track list

Awards and nominations

References

External links
 

1970 films
1970s Hindi-language films
1970s romance films
Films scored by Shankar–Jaikishan
Indian romance films
Hindi-language romance films